Christian Social Union may refer to:

Christian Social Union in Bavaria, a political party in Bavaria, Germany
Christian Social Union (Croatia), a political party in Croatia
Christian Social Union (UK), an English Anglican social gospel membership organisation
Christian Social Union (US), a Social Gospel membership association established in the United States in April 1891